Aq Qabaq-e Vosta (also Romanized as Āq Qabāq-e Vosţá; also known as Āq Qabāq) is a village in Aslan Duz Rural District, Aslan Duz District, Parsabad County, Ardabil Province, Iran. At the 2006 census, its population was 123, in 26 families.

References 

Towns and villages in Parsabad County